The Girl from Tomorrow Part II: Tomorrow's End is an Australian children's television series created by Film Australia. The series is a sequel series to The Girl from Tomorrow, and was first broadcast in 1993.

The story follows on from the first series with new dangers and adventures, primarily focusing around the events in the year 2500.

Premise 
At the end of the previous series, Jenny Kelly was badly injured in the final struggle with Silverthorn for the Time Capsule, and must be taken to the year 3000, to be healed there. The story picks up a month after Jenny and Alana arrive back to the year 3000. The scientists soon realise that their time travel experiments have gone wrong and that they have altered the course of history. They must send Jenny and Silverthorn back to their respective times, in order to restore the timeline. Silverthorn, having faked remorse for his crimes, has surreptitiously stolen instructions for building the Time Gate. With Silverthorn and Jenny back in their own times, Alana and Lorien (Catherine McClements) return to the year 3000, only to discover that it is a radioactive wasteland: The Great Disaster has destroyed the Southern Hemisphere as well as the Northern Hemisphere. They go back to 2500 and find that that era has not been altered, so they realise that it must be something Silverthorn does in 2500 that changes history and leads to The Great Disaster. In order to restore the timeline, Alana and Lorien must discover the cause of The Great Disaster, and prevent it.

The year 2500 is a polluted, miserable dystopia, where GlobeCorp owns everything, and the majority of people live in relative squalor. Clean water and uncontaminated food are hard to come by, although the elite enjoy life in comfortable skyscrapers, and the top leaders live in a colony on the moon.

With the help of Jenny and Nik, Alana must search for the cause of The Great Disaster, while evading capture by the GlobeCops and new villain Draco. They must also find a way to stop Silverthorn's plan to transport water from 1990 to the year 2500, which he does by using the Year 3000 information he has stolen to construct the Time Gate.

Character profiles

James Rooney
James is the science teacher at the high school Jenny attends. Irene fell for him when she met him after enrolling Alana there. James helped all the others in their efforts to retrieve the Capsule so Alana could return home.

Draco
Draco is a manager of GlobeCorp, a company that runs the entire planet. He wants to get rid of Paradise and the other GlobeCorp leaders, so he could run GlobeCorp all by himself.

Nik
Nik is a fifteen-year-old boy from the year 2500. Nik helps out Jenny and Alana when they are both captured by GlobeCorp. Nik's grandmother, Maeve is the inventor of the first Transducer.

Lorien
Lorien is one of Alana's guardians while she is living on Earth. She is also Bruno's assistant on the Time Travel Project.

Technology in the year 2500
In the year 2500, technology is more advanced than in 1990. Some of the technology is described below.

Laser pistols
The most often used weapon in use in the year 2500 is the laser pistol. When the pistol is used, the trigger is held, allowing energy to build up within the target, and when the trigger is released the energy within the object causes it to explode.

Storeman
Molecular Level Music Storage Unit. A device in the year 2500 which is used to play and store music. The sphere glows different colors as it plays. Seen once in episode '202 - The End of Everything,' the second episode of this series.

Drone
This object works as a camera. It has the shape of a red tube. It has a microphone and also has the ability to be far from its operator, which makes it a great spying device.

The Modification Chamber
This is where the process of "Modification" takes place, a euphemism for brainwashing. This process is used on anybody who has been arrested. The person is placed in the chamber and when the machine is activated they are bathed in white light; this process freezes the subject's mind. This essentially removes the person's free will. After the process the person will obey simple commands and they are then put to work doing menial tasks.

Technology in the year 3000
In the year 3000, all scientific experiments and technological advancements are carried out within the Science Dome. One area within the Science Dome is the Time Laboratory. This is where all time travel experiments are performed. Technology used in the laboratory includes the Time Capsule, and the temporal flux generators, as well as other diagnostic tools. Below follows a short list of significant technology used in the future.

Only the new technology of the Time Gate and the Sentinel is described in this article, for other technology from the year 3000 see

The Time Gate
The Time Gate is another of Bruno's inventions. It is another time-travel device. It is an energy doorway which can be used to travel through time as easily as stepping through a door. Temporal co-ordinates are entered into the Time Gate via a numerical keypad. When the co-ordinates have been input into the Time Gate, beams of energy begin to flash within the confines of the Gate getting faster until a wormhole-like portal appears. The user can then step from one time to another by walking through the Gate.

Sentinel
The sentinel is a device from the year 3000. When programmed, it will follow a person who may wish to cause harm to others, and will prevent them from causing harm. If somebody feels threatened and calls for help the sentinel will activate and fire an energy beam and the person will freeze, thus preventing them from causing possible harm. Once activated it can only be deactivated via the use of a Transducer.

Episode list

Broadcast
Tomorrow's End was broadcast on the Nine Network in 1991, and was later shown in the United Kingdom between 13 July 1993 and 20 August 1993.

Home media
Both The Girl from Tomorrow and The Girl from Tomorrow Part II: Tomorrow's End are also available on DVD, albeit in an edited "Telemovie" version (the whole series trimmed to movie length, halving the running time at least) and not in their original, episodic format.

A 4-disc set containing all 12 episodes of The Girl from Tomorrow was released on 18 September 2006 (Region 0) around Australia into various retail outlets via Shock Exports. A 4-disc set containing all 12 episodes of The Girl from Tomorrow Part II: Tomorrow's End is also available, released in May 2007.

All DVDs released so far have been in PAL format, and Region 0 encoded. Both series and the Telemovies are out of print.

Both seasons are available to stream on Amazon Prime Video in the UK.

See also 
 The Girl from Tomorrow
 List of Australian television series

External links 
 
The Girl From Tomorrow: Tomorrow's End at ClassicKidsTV.co.uk
 

Nine Network original programming
Australian children's television series
Australian time travel television series
1993 Australian television series debuts
1993 Australian television series endings
Television series about teenagers
Television shows set in Sydney
BBC children's television shows
Sequel television series